The Magnificent Seven is a 1960 American Western film directed by John Sturges. The screenplay by William Roberts is a remake – in an Old West–style – of Akira Kurosawa's 1954 Japanese film Seven Samurai (itself initially released in the United States as The Magnificent Seven). The ensemble cast includes Yul Brynner, Steve McQueen, Charles Bronson, Robert Vaughn, Brad Dexter, James Coburn, and Horst Buchholz as a group of seven gunfighters and Eli Wallach as their main antagonist. The seven title characters are hired to protect a small village in Mexico from a group of marauding bandits led by Wallach.

The film was released by United Artists on October 12, 1960. It was both a critical and commercial success and has been appraised as one of the greatest films of the Western genre. It spawned three sequels, a television series that aired from 1998 to 2000, and a 2016 film remake. Elmer Bernstein's film score was nominated for an Academy Award for Best Original Score and is listed on the American Film Institute's list of the top 25 American film scores. In 2013, the film was selected for preservation in the United States National Film Registry by the Library of Congress as being "culturally, historically, or aesthetically significant".

Plot
A gang of bandits led by Calvera periodically raids a poor Mexican village for food and supplies. After the latest raid, during which Calvera kills a villager, the village leaders decide they have had enough. On the advice of the village elder, they decide to fight back. Taking their few objects of value, three villagers ride to a town just inside the United States border hoping to barter for weapons. They are impressed by Chris Adams, a veteran Cajun gunslinger, and approach him for advice. Chris suggests they instead hire gunfighters to defend the village, as "men are cheaper than guns." At first agreeing only to help them recruit men, Chris eventually decides to lead the group. Despite the meager pay offered, he finds five willing gunmen.

The five other gunmen are the gunfighter Vin Tanner, who has gone broke after a round of gambling and resists local efforts to recruit him as a store clerk; Chris's friend Harry Luck, who assumes Chris is hiding a much bigger reward for the work; the Irish Mexican Bernardo O'Reilly, who has fallen on hard times; Britt, an expert in both knife and gun who joins purely for the challenge involved; and the dapper, on-the-run gunman Lee, plagued by nightmares of fallen enemies and haunted that he has lost his nerve for battle. On their way to the village, they are trailed by the hotheaded Chico, an aspiring gunfighter whose previous attempts to join Chris had been spurned. Impressed by his persistence, Chris invites him into the group.

Arriving at the village, they work with the villagers to build fortifications and train them to defend themselves. They note the lack of women in the village until Chico stumbles upon Petra and discovers the women were hidden in fear that the gunmen would rape them. The gunmen begin to bond with the villagers, and Petra pursues Chico. When Bernardo points out that the gunmen are being given the choice food, the gunmen share it with the village children.

Three of Calvera's men are dispatched to reconnoitre the village; due to a mistake by Chico, the seven are forced to kill all three rather than capture at least one. Some days later Calvera and his bandits arrive in force. The seven and the villagers kill another eight of their cohorts in a shootout and run them out of town. The villagers celebrate, believing Calvera will not return. But Chico infiltrates Calvera's camp and learns that Calvera must return, as his men are short of food.

Some fearful villagers thereupon call for the gunfighters to leave. Even some of the seven waver, but Chris insists that they stay, even threatening to kill anyone who suggests giving up the fight. The seven ride out to make a surprise raid on Calvera's camp but find it abandoned. Returning to the village, they are caught by Calvera and his men, who have colluded with some of the villagers to sneak in and take control. Calvera spares the seven's lives, believing they have learned the simple farmers are not worth fighting for and fearing reprisals from the gunfighters' "friends" across the border. Preparing to depart, Chris and Vin admit they have become emotionally attached to the village. Bernardo likewise gets angry when the boys he befriended call their parents cowards. Chico declares that he hates the villagers; when Chris points out he grew up as a farmer as well, Chico angrily responds that it is men like Calvera and Chris who made the villagers what they are.

The seven gunmen are escorted some distance from the village, where their weapons are returned to them. They debate their next move and all but Harry, who believes the effort will be futile and suicidal, agree to return and fight.

The gunmen infiltrate the village and a gunfight breaks out. Harry, who has had a change of heart, returns in time to save Chris's life but is himself fatally shot. Harry pleads to know what they were fighting for, and Chris lies about a hidden gold mine to let Harry believe he died for a fortune; Harry smiles before dying. Lee finds the nerve to burst into a house where several villagers are being held, shooting their captors and releasing the prisoners to join the fight but is gunned down as he leaves the house. Bernardo, shot protecting the boys he befriended, tells them as he dies to see how bravely their fathers fought. Britt dies after shooting at many bandits but exposing himself from cover. Chris shoots Calvera, who asks him, "You came back... to a place like this? Why? A man like you? Why?" He dies without receiving an answer. The remaining bandits take flight.

The three surviving gunmen ride out of town. As they stop atop a hill overlooking the village, Chico parts company with them, realizing he wants to stay with Petra. Chris and Vin bid farewell to the village elder, who tells them that only the villagers have really won, whereas the gunslingers are "like the wind, blowing over the land and passing on." As they pass the graves of their fallen comrades, Chris admits, "The Old Man was right. Only the farmers won. We lost. We'll always lose."

Cast

The Seven 

 Yul Brynner as Chris Adams, a Cajun gunslinger, leader of the seven
 Steve McQueen as Vin Tanner, a drifter
 Horst Buchholz as Chico, the young, hot-blooded shootist
 Charles Bronson as Bernardo O'Reilly, the professional in need of money
 Robert Vaughn as Lee, the traumatized veteran
 Brad Dexter as Harry Luck, the fortune seeker
 James Coburn as Britt, the knife expert

Others 

 Eli Wallach as Calvera, the bandit chief
 Vladimir Sokoloff as the old man of the village
 Jorge Martínez de Hoyos as Hilario
 Rosenda Monteros as Petra
 Rico Alaniz as Sotero
 Pepe Hern as Tomás
 Natividad Vacío as Salvador
 Robert J. Wilke as Wallace
 John A. Alonzo as Miguel
 Roberto Contreras as Luis
 Whit Bissell as Chamlee, the undertaker
 Val Avery as Henry, the corset salesman
 Bing Russell as Robert, Henry's traveling companion
 Valentin de Vargas as Santos, a Calvera henchman
 Joseph Ruskin as Flynn

Production

Development
Lou Morheim acquired rights to remake the film in the US for $2,500. He later signed a deal with Yul Brynner's production company, who bought the rights from Morheim for $10,000 up front plus $1,000 a week as a producer and 5% of the net profits. Anthony Quinn was lined up to star with Brynner as director but later Martin Ritt was appointed as director with Brynner starring.

Brynner approached producer Walter Mirisch with the idea of remaking Kurosawa's famous samurai film. However, once Mirisch had acquired the rights and finalized a deal with United Artists, Brynner was sued for breach of contract by Quinn, who claimed that he and Brynner had developed the concept together and had worked out many of the film's details before the two had a falling-out. Quinn ultimately lost his claim because there was nothing in writing.

The film's title comes from the initial American localized title of Seven Samurai, which was initially released under the title The Magnificent Seven in the United States in 1955.

Writing
Script credit was a subject of contention. Associate producer Morheim commissioned Walter Bernstein, a blacklisted scriptwriter, to produce the first draft "faithfully" adapted from the original script written by Shinobu Hashimoto, Hideo Oguni and Akira Kurosawa; when Mirisch and Brynner took over the production, they brought on Walter Newman, whose version "is largely what's onscreen." When Newman was unavailable to be onsite during the film's principal photography in Mexico, William Roberts was hired, in part to make changes required by Mexican censors. When Roberts asked the Writers Guild of America for a co-credit, Newman asked that his name be removed from the credits.

Casting
Sturges was eager to cast Steve McQueen in the picture, having just worked with him on the 1959 film Never So Few, but McQueen could not get a release from actor/producer Dick Powell, who controlled McQueen's hit TV series Wanted Dead or Alive. On the advice of his agent, McQueen, an experienced race car driver, staged a car accident and claimed that he could not work on his series because he had suffered a whiplash injury and had to wear a neck brace. During the interval required for his "recuperation", he was free to appear in The Magnificent Seven.

James Coburn was a great fan of the Japanese film Seven Samurai, having seen it 15 times, and was hired through the help of co-star and former classmate Robert Vaughn, after the role of the expert knifethrower had been rejected by actors Sterling Hayden and John Ireland.

Robert Vaughn, who died on November 11, 2016, was the last surviving member of the seven, and Rosenda Monteros was the last surviving cast member until her death on December 29, 2018.

Filming
The film was shot by cinematographer Charles Lang in a 35mm anamorphic format using Panavision lenses. Location shooting began on March 1, 1960, in Mexico, where both the village and the U.S. border town were built for the film. The location filming was in Cuernavaca, Durango, and Tepoztlán and at the Churubusco Studios. The first scenes were the first part of the six gunfighters' journey to the Mexican village prior to Chico being brought into the group.

During filming there was considerable tension between Brynner and McQueen, who was displeased at his character having only seven lines of dialogue in the original shooting script (Sturges had told McQueen that he would "give him the camera"). To compensate, McQueen took numerous opportunities to upstage Brynner and draw attention to himself, including shielding his eyes with his hat, flipping a coin during one of Brynner's speeches, and rattling his shotgun shells. Brynner would often build up a little mound of earth to make himself look as tall as McQueen, only to have McQueen kick the dirt out of place when he passed by. When newspapers started reporting about a rivalry, Brynner issued a press statement saying, "I never feud with actors. I feud with studios."

Music

Soundtrack

The film's score is by Elmer Bernstein. Along with the readily recognized main theme and effective support of the story line, the score also contains allusions to twentieth-century symphonic works, such as the reference to Bartok's Concerto for Orchestra, second movement, in the tense quiet scene just before the shootout. The original soundtrack was not released at the time until reused and rerecorded by Bernstein for the soundtrack of Return of the Seven. Electric guitar cover versions by Al Caiola in the U.S. and John Barry in the U.K. were successful on the popular charts. A vocal theme not written by Bernstein was used in a trailer.

In 1994, James Sedares conducted a re-recording of the score performed by The Phoenix Symphony Orchestra, which also included a suite from Bernstein's score for The Hallelujah Trail, issued by Koch Records; Bernstein himself conducted the Royal Scottish National Orchestra for a performance released by RCA in 1997, but the original film soundtrack was not released until the following year by Rykodisc. (Varèse Sarabande issued this album in 1996, and reissued it in 2004.)

 Main Title and Calvera (3:56)
 Council (3:14)
 Quest (1:00)
 Strange Funeral/After The Brawl (6:48)
 Vin's Luck (2:03)
 And Then There Were Two (1:45)
 Fiesta (1:11)
 Stalking (1:20)
 Worst Shot (3:02)
 The Journey (4:39)
 Toro (3:24)
 Training (1:27)
 Calvera's Return (2:37)
 Calvera Routed (1:49)
 Ambush (3:10)
 Petra's Declaration (2:30)
 Bernardo (3:33)
 Surprise (2:08)
 Defeat (3:26)
 Crossroads (4:47)
 Harry's Mistake (2:48)
 Calvera Killed (3:33)
 Finale (3:27)

At the 33rd Academy Awards, the score was nominated for Best Score of a Dramatic or Comedy Picture, losing to Ernest Gold's score for Exodus. In 2005, the score for The Magnificent Seven was listed at  8 on the American Film Institute's list of the top 25 American film scores.

In other media
Bernstein's score has frequently been quoted in the media and popular culture. Starting in 1963, the theme was used in commercials in the U.S. for Marlboro cigarettes for many years. A similar-sounding (but different) tune was used for Victoria Bitter beer in Australia, as was a similar-sounding (but different) tune for the introduction to the National Geographic television show. The theme was included in a scene of the James Bond film Moonraker.

Other uses include in the 2004 documentary film Fahrenheit 9/11; in the 2005 film The Ringer; in the 2015 film Hardcore Henry; as entrance music for the British band James, as well as episodes of The Simpsons that had a "Western" theme (mainly in the episode titled "Dude, Where's My Ranch?"). The opening horn riff in Arthur Conley's 1967 hit "Sweet Soul Music" is borrowed from the theme. Canadian band Kon Kan use the opening bars of the theme in their single "I Beg Your Pardon". Celtic Football Club (Glasgow, Scotland) used the theme music whenever Henrik Larsson scored a goal. The 2008 J-pop song "Ōgoe Diamond" by AKB48 also used part of the main theme.

The Cheers episode "Diane Chambers Day" (season 4, episode 22) revolves around the bar denizens being invited to watch The Magnificent Seven and ends with them singing an a cappella version of the theme.

The Mick Jones 1980s band Big Audio Dynamite covered the song as "Keep off the Grass" (although this cover was not officially released). In 1995, the KLF also did a drum and bass cover of the main title as "The Magnificent"; it was released under the group alias One World Orchestra on the charity compilation The Help Album.

In 1992, the main theme of The Magnificent Seven came into use on a section of the Disneyland Railroad at Disneyland Paris. Portions of the theme play as the train exits the Grand Canyon diorama tunnel behind Phantom Manor, enters Frontierland, and travels along the bank of the Rivers of the Far West.

The "Main Title" was used as an intro tune on many nights of Bruce Springsteen's 2012 Wrecking Ball Tour. The theme was played as the E Street Band entered the stage, adding to the dramatic atmosphere in the stadium.

Release

Theatrical
The film opened on October 12, 1960, in a thousand theaters across the South and Southwest of the United States.

Reception

Box office
In the United States and Canada, the film earned  in theatrical rentals and was a box office disappointment, but proved to be such a smash hit in Europe that it ultimately made a profit. The overseas rental was almost three times as much as in the U.S. with a total of $7.5 million, giving it worldwide rentals of $9.75 million.

In Western Europe, the film sold  tickets in Italy, 7,037,826 tickets in France, and 7.7million tickets in the United Kingdom, becoming one of the top 100 highest-grossing films in the United Kingdom and in France. It was also successful in Germany. In the Soviet Union (where Brynner was originally from), the film sold 67million tickets, becoming the highest-grossing Hollywood film ever in the Soviet Union (where it was among only a handful of Hollywood films to become blockbusters there). In South Korea, it sold 80,870 tickets in Seoul City, and it was also successful in Japan. This adds up to a total of at least 89,118,696 tickets sold in overseas territories.

Critical response
Contemporary reviews were mixed to positive. Howard Thompson of The New York Times called the film a "pallid, pretentious and overlong reflection of the Japanese original";  according to Thompson, "don't expect anything like the ice-cold suspense, the superb juxtaposition of revealing human vignettes and especially the pile-driver tempo of the first Seven." According to Variety, "Until the women and children arrive on the scene about two-thirds of the way through, The Magnificent Seven is a rip-roaring rootin' tootin' western with lots of bite and tang and old-fashioned abandon. The last third is downhill, a long and cluttered anti-climax in which The Magnificent Seven grow slightly too magnificent for comfort." Richard L. Coe of The Washington Post called the film "rough, tough, funny and splashy most of the way. There's a serious dip the final third, but Keith's newcomer offers shrewd, vastly enjoyable performances." Harrison's Reports praised the film as "A superb Western, well acted and crammed full of action, human interest, pathos, suspense, plus some romance and humor." A positive review from Charles Stinson in the Los Angeles Times praised the dialogue as "by turns, virile, rowdily funny and then, abruptly, not always predictably, it is pensive, even gentle. John Sturges' direction is superbly staccato; making a knife-sharp use of pauses and silences, it brings out both the humor and melancholy, the humanity as well as the evil inherent in the situation." The Monthly Film Bulletin called the casting of Yul Brynner and Horst Buchholz "curious" and thought Chico's decision to stay put was "the film's most completely unbelievable contrivance," but still thought that "the film manages to be both impressive and likeable." Akira Kurosawa, for his part, was reportedly so impressed by the film that he presented John Sturges with a sword.

The film has grown greatly in esteem since its release, in no small part due to its cast (several of whom were to go on to become superstars over the decade following its release) and its music score, but also due to the quality of the script. On Rotten Tomatoes, the film has an approval score of 89% based on 44 reviews, with an average rating of 8.00/10. The consensus reads, "The Magnificent Seven transplants Seven Samurai into the Old West with a terrific cast of Hollywood stars—and without losing any of the story's thematic richness." It is the second most shown film in U.S. television history, behind only The Wizard of Oz. The film is also ranked  79 on the AFI's list of American cinema's 100 most-thrilling films.

Other media

Sequels

Three sequels were eventually made: Return of the Seven (1966), Guns of the Magnificent Seven (1969), and The Magnificent Seven Ride! (1972). Yul Brynner returned as Chris Adams for Return of the Seven, but was replaced in the sequels by George Kennedy and Lee Van Cleef. He was the only member of the cast to return for any of the sequels. None were as successful as the original film.

Television series

The film also inspired a television series, The Magnificent Seven, which ran from 1998 to 2000. Robert Vaughn was a recurring guest star, a judge who hires the seven to protect the town in which his widowed daughter-in-law and his grandson live.

Music
In 1981, The Clash released a song, "The Magnificent Seven", the third single from their fourth album, Sandinista!, which references the title of the 1960 film.

Unofficial remake

The 1980 science fiction film Battle Beyond the Stars was a remake of The Magnificent Seven set in space. A group of mercenaries, including ones played by George Peppard (as a character known only as "Space Cowboy") and Robert Vaughn (playing essentially the same character as in The Magnificent Seven) defend farmers from space raiders on the planet Akir, home of the Akira (named after Seven Samurai director Akira Kurosawa).

In popular culture
 The 1980s action-adventure series The A-Team was initially devised as a combination of The Dirty Dozen and The Magnificent Seven. The show's pilot film plays much on the plot of The Magnificent Seven, and there are similar plot echoes in various other episodes. James Coburn was originally approached to play John "Hannibal" Smith, the team's leader, a role that ultimately went to George Peppard in the series; and Robert Vaughn was added to the cast in the final season as part of a revamp attempt to boost fading ratings.

 Also in the 1980s, the British Television Series, Auf Wiedersehen, Pet, specifically the second series, heavily references the film. The first two episodes are called, "The Return of the Seven (Parts 1 and 2)" and the cast have a discussion during a stop on a motorway service area, each choosing an actor from the film that they feel best represents them. The soundtrack also references the main theme.

Remake

The Magnificent Seven, a remake of the film with the same title, was released in 2016, directed by Antoine Fuqua and starred Denzel Washington, Chris Pratt, Ethan Hawke, Vincent D'Onofrio, Lee Byung-hun, Manuel Garcia-Rulfo, Martin Sensmeier and Peter Sarsgaard.

See also

 List of American films of 1960
 Samurai 7

References

Works cited

Bibliography

External links

 The Magnificent Seven essay  by Stephen Prince on the National Film Registry web site
 
 
 
 
 

1960 films
1960 Western (genre) films
Adaptations of works by Akira Kurosawa
American remakes of Japanese films
American Western (genre) films
1960s English-language films
Fictional mercenaries
Films scored by Elmer Bernstein
Films adapted into television shows
Films directed by John Sturges
Films set in Mexico
Films set in Texas
Films shot in Mexico
Films with screenplays by Walter Bernstein
Seven Samurai
Siege films
United Artists films
United States National Film Registry films
Films with screenplays by Walter Newman (screenwriter)
Revisionist Western (genre) films
Magnificent Seven films
Films with screenplays by William Roberts (screenwriter)
1960s American films
1960s Japanese films